In four-dimensional Euclidean geometry, the steritruncated 16-cell honeycomb is a uniform space-filling honeycomb, with runcinated 24-cell, truncated 16-cell,  octahedral prism, 3-6 duoprism, and truncated tetrahedral prism cells.

Alternate names
 Celliprismated icositetrachoric tetracomb (capicot)
 Great prismatotetracontaoctachoric tetracomb

Related honeycombs

See also 
Regular and uniform honeycombs in 4-space:
Tesseractic honeycomb
16-cell honeycomb
24-cell honeycomb
Rectified 24-cell honeycomb
Snub 24-cell honeycomb
5-cell honeycomb
Truncated 5-cell honeycomb
Omnitruncated 5-cell honeycomb

References 
 Coxeter, H.S.M. Regular Polytopes, (3rd edition, 1973), Dover edition,  p. 296, Table II: Regular honeycombs
 Kaleidoscopes: Selected Writings of H.S.M. Coxeter, edited by F. Arthur Sherk, Peter McMullen, Anthony C. Thompson, Asia Ivic Weiss, Wiley-Interscience Publication, 1995,  
 (Paper 24) H.S.M. Coxeter, Regular and Semi-Regular Polytopes III, [Math. Zeit. 200 (1988) 3-45]
 George Olshevsky, Uniform Panoploid Tetracombs, Manuscript (2006) (Complete list of 11 convex uniform tilings, 28 convex uniform honeycombs, and 143 convex uniform tetracombs) Model 121 (Wrongly named runcinated icositetrachoric honeycomb)
  x3x3o4o3x - capicot - O127

5-polytopes
Honeycombs (geometry)
Truncated tilings